Ivanovskaya is a rural locality (a village) in Malyshevskoye Rural Settlement, Selivanovsky District, Vladimir Oblast, Russia. The population was 161 as of 2010. There are 2 streets.

Geography 
Ivanovskaya is located 46 km southwest of Krasnaya Gorbatka (the district's administrative centre) by road. Pervomaysky is the nearest rural locality.

References 

Rural localities in Selivanovsky District